Ryan Shea McKenna (born February 14, 1997) is an American professional baseball outfielder for the Baltimore Orioles of Major League Baseball (MLB). He made his MLB debut in 2021.

Early life
McKenna was born on February 14, 1997, in Grants Pass, Oregon, to parents Marty and Marlene. Although he was born in Oregon, his family moved to Berwick, Maine when he was young. His father coached him from tee-ball through his freshman year. While in the seventh grade, McKenna joined his older brother on his high schools varsity baseball team.

Amateur career
McKenna attended Portsmouth Christian Academy (PCA) in Dover, New Hampshire, as a freshman before transferring to St. Thomas Aquinas High School. Within his second week at St. Thomas, his coach received phone calls from colleges inquiring about his post-secondary aspirations. In his sophomore season, McKenna committed to attend Liberty University on a 40 percent college baseball scholarship after attending one of their summer training camps. He later stated that the majority of that decision rested on their Judeo-Christian values. He then gained national attention after batting .308 with five stolen bases in the Area Code Games and performing well during the East Coast Pro Showcase. During his junior year with the St. Thomas Saints, McKenna, batted .551 and drove in 31 runs. In his senior year, McKenna hit .452 with five extra-base hits despite missing five of his team’s 16-regular-season games due to a strained hamstring. He returned to help the St. Thomas Saints in the Division II tournament before they were upset by 11th-seeded John Stark of Weare in the tournament's preliminary round.

Professional career

The Baltimore Orioles selected McKenna in the fourth round of the 2015 MLB draft, making him the first New England high school player chosen in the draft. He subsequently signed with the Orioles and made his professional debut with the Gulf Coast Orioles of the Rookie-level Gulf Coast League, playing in only ten games due to an ankle injury. In 2016, he played for the Aberdeen IronBirds of the Class A-Short Season New York-Penn League, and batted .241 in 62 games. He played for the Delmarva Shorebirds of the Class A South Atlantic League in 2017 where he batted .256 with seven home runs and 42 RBIs in 126 games.

McKenna began the 2018 season with the Frederick Keys of the Class A-Advanced Carolina League, and earned a midseason promotion to the Bowie Baysox of the Class AA Eastern League. After the 2018 season, he played for the Glendale Desert Dogs of the Arizona Fall League. He returned to Bowie to start the 2019 season. McKenna was added to the Orioles 40–man roster following the 2019 season. McKenna did not play in a game in 2020 due to the cancellation of the minor league season because of the COVID-19 pandemic.

On April 5, 2021, McKenna was promoted to the major leagues for the first time to fill in for Austin Hays, who was dealing with a hamstring strain. He made his MLB debut that day as the starting right fielder against the New York Yankees. He collected his first major league hit on April 11, a triple off of Nick Pivetta of the Boston Red Sox. On July 25, McKenna collected his first career home run with a solo shot off of Washington Nationals starter Paolo Espino.

References

External links

Living people
1997 births
People from Berwick, Maine
Baseball players from Maine
Major League Baseball outfielders
Baltimore Orioles players
Gulf Coast Orioles players
Aberdeen IronBirds players
Delmarva Shorebirds players
Frederick Keys players
Bowie Baysox players
Glendale Desert Dogs players